Kasalia is a village in Gopalganj District, Bangladesh, part of Muksudpur Upazila. The village covers an area of 4 km2, and is bordered by the villages of Nanikhir, Gunohar, Nawkhanda and Mosna, Goinary.  Pathorghata's main canal is the Hatashe Channel and flow up to Kasalia . The Bil Rout Canal at Jalirpar joins with the Hatashe Canal to the river Padma

Kasalia also is a Union Parishad under was established in 1634 consist of eight number of villages. The village consists of three wards and few mahallas. The village has a high school, a primary school, seven mosques, a government hospital, and few community schools.

Non-governmental organizations operating in Pathorghata include BDAO (the Bangladesh Development Acceleration Organisation), BRAC, CCDB, ASA, World Vision, and HCCB.

References 
 Kasalia Map — Satellite Images, coordinates and short facts of Kasalia

Populated places in Dhaka Division